Nicut is an unincorporated community in Calhoun County, West Virginia, United States.

The community has existed since at least the 1850s.

Notable people
Jake Krack, old-time fiddler
Lester McCumbers, old-time fiddler

References

Unincorporated communities in Calhoun County, West Virginia
Unincorporated communities in West Virginia